Lalchhanhima Sailo may refer to:
 Lalchhanhima Sailo (rabbi)
 Lalchhanhima Sailo (footballer)